Brevipecten captata is a moth of the family Noctuidae first described by Arthur Gardiner Butler in 1889.

Distribution
It is found in India, Sri Lanka, and Australia.

Description
Its wingspan is about 3 cm. Adults are pale brown. On the forewings there are two white bordered dark patches on the costa. Hindwings are plain pale brown.

References

Moths of Asia
Moths described in 1889